Caeté is a municipality in Minas Gerais, Brazil.

Caeté or Caetés may also refer to:

Caeté people, an indigenous people of Brazil
 Caeté River (Acre), Brazil
 Caeté River (Pará), Brazil
Caeté-Taperaçu Marine Extractive Reserve
Caetés, Pernambuco, a municipality in Pernambuco, Brazil